John Aldridge (born 1958) is a former Republic of Ireland international footballer and football manager.

John Aldridge may also refer to:

 John Aldridge (cricketer) (born 1935), English cricketer
 John Aldridge (RAF officer) (1899–1988), World War I flying ace
 John Aldridge (artist) (1905–1983), British oil painter, draftsmen, wallpaper designer, and art teacher
 John Aldridge (British politician) (1832–1888), British Conservative Party politician
 John Clater Aldridge, Storekeeper of the Ordnance and Member of Parliament
 John W. Aldridge (1922–2007), American writer, literary critic, teacher and scholar
 John Mullings Aldridge, Anglican priest